Puerto Cabezas is a municipality and city in Nicaragua. It is the capital of Miskito nation in the North Caribbean Coast Autonomous Region.

The municipality and the entire region are native American lands. The city of Puerto Cabezas borders the Community of Ten Communities.

History
Hurricane Felix hit Puerto Cabezas on September 4, 2007, killing about 100 people. Hurricane Eta hit the city on November 3, 2020, causing extensive damage. On November 16, 2020, Hurricane Iota hit the city as a strong Category 4.

Climate
Puerto Cabezas has a tropical monsoon climate (Köppen climate classification Am) with significant rainfall year round, and a short dry season in March and April.

Culture
Puerto Cabezas culture is diverse, being Miskito culture the dominant, followed by Creole, Mayangna and Latino.

The culture, like the rest of Nicaragua's Caribbean coast, has a very prominent Caribbean influence.

Education
The University of the Autonomous Regions of the Nicaraguan Caribbean Coast (URACCAN) has a campus in Puerto Cabezas, as well as in several other locations in the RACCN and the RACCS.

Transportation
The city is served by Puerto Cabezas Airport.

Twin towns – sister cities

Puerto Cabezas is sister city to:
 Burlington, United States
 Luleå, Sweden
 Sant Pere de Ribes, Spain
 Vilafranca del Penedès, Spain

See also
Awas Tingni
Stennett H. Brooks

References

Municipalities of the North Caribbean Coast Autonomous Region
North Caribbean Coast Autonomous Region